Mary Hudson  may refer to:

Mary Hudson (businesswoman)
Mary Hudson (organist)
Mary Hudson (scientist)
Mary Hudson (writer)